Sclerorhachis is a genus of Asian plants in the chamomile tribe within the daisy family.

 Species
 Sclerorhachis caulescens (Aitch. & Hemsl.) Rech.f. - Afghanistan
 Sclerorhachis kjurendaghi (Kurbanov) Kovalevsk.
 Sclerorhachis leptoclada Rech.f. - Iran
 Sclerorhachis paropamisica (Krasch.) Kovalevsk.
 Sclerorhachis platyrachis (Boiss.) Podlech ex Rech.f. - Iran
 Sclerorhachis polysphaera Rech.f. -  Afghanistan
 Sclerorhachis rechingeri Iranshahr - Iran

References

Asteraceae genera
Anthemideae